Chris Agoliati is a retired American soccer player who played at least two seasons in the American Soccer League and three in the North American Soccer League.

Agoliati graduated from the Staten Island Academy in 1969 and Cornell University in 1973. He was an All-American, first team All Ivy on the Big Red soccer team. In 1973, he signed with the Connecticut Wildcats and started as a defender at left fullback in front of Soccer Hall of Famer Tony Diccio. In 1975, he moved to the Boston Minutemen of the North American Soccer League. In 1975 on national television Agoliati scored a goal against Pele and the New York Cosmos. At the end of the season he signed with the expansion Tacoma Tides in the ASL.  He started at the mid-field the whole season. The next year Agoliati moved back to the NASL, this time with the New York Cosmos with teammates Pele, Beckanbauer, Chiniglia, and Shep Messing. Agoliati then retired at the age of 27 to pursue a career as a licensed real estate broker in New York State.

In 1979, he purchased the Paramount Theater of Stapleton, Staten Island and turned it into a disco and rock and roll club.  Coming from Warner Communications and Atlantic Records with the contacts he became an established rock and roll promoter. As a rock and roll promoter, the venue brought such acts as The Ramones, The Talking Heads, B52S, Billy Idol, Joan Jett, Flock of Seagulls, The Specials, The Paul Shaefer Band of the David Letterman show, Southside Johnny and The Asbury Jukes and many more.

References

External links
 NASL Statistics
 Tacoma Tides player profile

1951 births
Living people
American Soccer League (1933–1983) players
Boston Minutemen players
Connecticut Wildcats soccer players
Cornell Big Red men's soccer players
Association football forwards
Association football midfielders
New York Cosmos players
North American Soccer League (1968–1984) players
North American Soccer League (1968–1984) indoor players
Sportspeople from Staten Island
Soccer players from New York City
Tacoma Tides players
American soccer players